Frances James may refer to:

Frances James (ecologist) (born 1930), American ecologist
Frances James (soprano) (1903–1988), Canadian soprano
Frances James (Winners & Losers), fictional character from the Australian drama series Winners & Losers

See also
Francis James (disambiguation)